was a Japanese prelate of the Roman Catholic Church.

Yasuda was born in Kurume, Japan and was ordained a priest on May 21, 1955. He was appointed auxiliary bishop of the Archdiocese of Osaka on February 5, 1970 as well as titular bishop of Tucci and was consecrated bishop on March 21, 1970. Yasuda was appointed archbishop of the Archdiocese of Osaka on November 15, 1978, where he served until his retirement on May 10, 1997. He died in April 2016 at the age of 94.

References 

 Catholic-Hierarchy
 Archdiocese of Osaka (Japanese)

1921 births
2016 deaths
20th-century Roman Catholic archbishops in Japan
People from Kurume
Japanese Roman Catholic archbishops